Peter Hric (born 17 June 1965) is a Slovak former cyclist. He competed in the men's cross-country mountain biking event at the 1996 Summer Olympics.

References

External links
 

1965 births
Living people
Slovak male cyclists
Olympic cyclists of Slovakia
Cyclists at the 1996 Summer Olympics
Sportspeople from Spišská Nová Ves
20th-century Slovak people
21st-century Slovak people